Clephanton  is a small hamlet 2 miles south-east from Ardersier and 7 miles south-west of Nairn in Inverness-shire, Scottish Highlands. It is in the Scottish council area of Highland. Some notable features near the settlement include the Kilravock Castle and the Nairn River.

References

Populated places in the County of Nairn